Michael R. Brambell is a British zoologist, and was director of the Chester Zoo, from 1978 to 1995.
He won the 1999 Silver Medal of the Zoological Society of London.

Life
He was curator of mammals at the London Zoo, when Chi Chi was there.

He is an exponent of captive breeding, to forestall animal extinction.

Works
Horse, tapir & rhinoceros, Bodley Head, 1976, 
Michael R. Brambell, London Zoo's Giant panda: Ailuropoda melatiolenca: 'Chi Chi', 1957–1972. International Zoo Yearbook, Volume 14, Issue 1, pages 163–164. Published online  18 December 2007. The Zoological Society of London, 1985.

References

British zoologists
Living people
Year of birth missing (living people)